The Roborovski hamster (Phodopus roborovskii), also known as the desert hamster, Robo dwarf hamster, or simply dwarf hamster, is the smallest of three species of hamster in the genus Phodopus. Distinguishing characteristics of the Roborovskis are eyebrow-like white spots and the lack of any dorsal stripe (found on the other members of the genus Phodopus). The average lifespan for the Roborovski hamster is 2–3 years, though this is dependent on living conditions (extremes being four years in captivity and two in the wild). Roborovskis are known for their speed and have been said to run up to 6 miles a night.

Distribution and habitat
Roborovski hamsters are found in desert regions, such as the basin of the lake Zaysan in Kazakhstan and regions of Tuva, Mongolia and Xinjiang in China. The hamsters inhabit areas of loose sand and sparse vegetation and are rarely found in areas of dense vegetation and solid clay substrates. They live at elevations of around – and although research has been carried out, no fossil record exists for this species. Their efficient use of water makes them particularly suited to the steppe and desert regions they inhabit. They dig and live in burrows with steep tunnels as deep as six feet underground. In the wild, Roborovski hamsters are crepuscular, being most active at dawn and dusk.

The Roborovski hamster has been found to be more common in the southern area of its distribution range, in areas such as Yulin, Shaanxi, China. It has been reported as a common sighting by locals in this city and in the sand dunes of the Ordos desert.

Diet 
They are omnivorous; they primarily eat grains, vegetables, fruit, and plants, but they will also eat meat and insects when present. Roborovski hamsters remain underground in winter and survive in that season by stockpiling some food in warmer weather and storing it in special food chambers within their burrow system.

The Roborovski hamster mainly feeds on seeds. In Tuva it primarily lives on the seed of the sand alyssum, Nitre Bush, Siberian peashrub, Dracocephalum peregrinum, and milkvetch as well as sedges during the summer-months. Vegetative plant parts are not of significance.

In the Chinese province of Shaanxi it is known for foraging millet seeds.

In Mongolia, insects like beetles, earwigs and crickets are part of its diet. According to Formosow the stock of several burrows indicate an almost insect-based diet. Also the consumption of snails has been reported.

In Tuva, the share of animal food is marginal. Flint and Golowkin determined in 1958 and 1959 that nearly 100 percent of the cheek pouches' content consisted of plant food, whereas animal food was only found in 23 percent of the hamsters' pouches at all in 1958 and 32  percent in 1959.

The daily dietary intake of the Roborovski hamsters heavily depends on its body weight. Juveniles have higher intakes of food compared to their weight than adult hamsters. Based on its population structure, Wan et al. calculated an average food intake of ca. two gram plant seeds per day. They specify the functional relation between the daily food intake (N) and the body-weight (M) to be  

Pups, juveniles as well as adult hamsters are foraging food in their burrows.

History of human contact
Russian expeditioner Lt. Vsevolod Roborovski first made note of these hamsters, discovering them on an expedition in July 1894, though they were not studied scientifically for the best part of another decade, until Konstantin A. Satunin made observations in 1903. The London Zoo imported them into the UK in the 1960s, but the first Roborovski hamsters studied in Britain were imported in the 1970s from Moscow Zoo. (None of them, however, bore offspring.) Continental European countries had more success in breeding some Roborovskis, however, and those currently in the UK are descendants of a batch imported from the Netherlands in 1990. They were imported to the US in 1998, though they are now commonly found in pet shops in several countries. In South Korea, they are almost as common as the winter-white Russian dwarf hamster.

Variation
The Roborovski hamster is distinguished from the Djungarian hamster (Phodopus sungorus) and Campbell's dwarf hamster (Phodopus campbelli) due to its smaller size, sandy coloration of fur and its lack of a dorsal stripe. When observed from behind, the neurocranium is rounded and does not appear to be as rectangular as Phodopus campbelli and Phodopus sungorus.

Currently,  10 variations of Roborovski hamsters are thought to exist.
Only one is standardised in the UK as of 2018 as per UK National Hamster Council with 4 genes recognised and others still under dispute. 
agouti — a natural grayish-brown with white underside and "eyebrows" (white over eyes)
"white face" — a dominant mutation producing an agouti-coloured hamster with a white face
"husky" — a recessive mutation producing a white-faced hamster with a paler, more dilute top coat and no dilution on the undercoat.
"mottled" or "pied" — both dominant and recessive mutations have been identified, these hamsters are white with the agouti colouring (or husky/blue/black/cinnamon) in irregular patches over their heads, bodies and sometimes their faces. 
"head spot" — a combination of the dominant and recessive pied genes that creates a pure white animal with one patch of colour on the head
"white-from-white-faced" or "dark-eared white" — a combination of the dominant white-faced gene and the husky gene that produces a white hamster that retains a greyish undercoat and ears. 
"white-from-pied" or "pure white" — is allegedly a combination of the two pied genes producing a white hamster. Note that two recessive pied genes do not make white.
"black eyed white" is a new gene that has proven not to be white from pied or white from white faced. This gene is still being explored.
"red-eyed" — a recessive mutation that produces a cinnamon-coloured hamster with a chocolate undercoat, dark red eyes, and pale ears. Adding pied to a cinnamon gives brighter red eyes. This is not the same mutation as 'brown eye' or rust.
Black/blue - Originally bred in Finland, going to The Netherlands and then Germany. Black and blue are two recessive genes still being investigated. These genes came to the UK in 2017 via Doric Hamstery and the first UK litter of blacks were born there Spring 2018. Both are thought to be self colours behaving like melanistic and its further dilution to blue that is already found in other species.

Breeding in captivity has also produced a darker variation of the naturally sandy-coloured agouti fur.  According to Fox (2006) white faced and derived breeds are considered torture-breeding and therefore breeding them is forbidden by law in several European countries like Germany or Austria. The homozygous carrier of the gene variant causes neurological symptoms similar to the whirling disease, where the animal spins itself around until it dies of exhaustion.

This concern is not seen in recessive white face (husky).

Breeding
The sex of a Roborovski is determined visually; female openings are very close together and may even look like a single opening, while male openings are further apart. Males usually have a visible scent gland near the navel above the two openings, appearing as a yellow stain in older animals.

The breeding season for the Roborovski hamster is between April and September. The gestation period is between 20 and 22 days, producing three to four litters. The litter size is between three and nine, with an average of six. Captive bred Roborovski do often breed all year round.

The offspring weigh – at birth. Upon being born, the offspring have no fur, the incisors and claws are visible, but the eyes, pinnae of the ear and digits are all sealed. After a period of three days, the whiskers become visible and after five days, the first dorsal hairs develop. The digits separate after six days and after eleven days, the body is completely formed. The young hamsters open their eyes by day 14.

As pets
Roborovski hamsters have become increasingly popular as pets in recent years, however, they are best suited to life as merely observational creatures, with limited interaction between them and humans, due to their increased activity levels that lead to a high stress predisposition and decreased ease of handling when compared to other domestic hamster species, but they can be tamed with time.

On average, Roborovski hamsters will live 26 months in captivity.

Although claimed to be hypoallergenic, Roborovski hamsters have been associated with the development of asthma in previously asymptomatic owners.

In rare emergency situations, a shallow dish of warm water may be necessary to clean harmful substances from a hamster's fur; however, under normal circumstances, hamsters should never be bathed in water as, aside from being incredibly stressful, this can remove vital protective oils from their coat, which can be very dangerous and potentially fatal. Hamsters frequently groom themselves, and instead of water, a sand bath should be offered to help them stay clean and healthy.

Housing 

Unlike other species of hamster (see 'Syrian hamster behavior'), Roborovski hamsters can sometimes be kept in same-sex pairs or small groups if raised together from a young age. A lone, or pair of Roborovski hamsters should be kept in a cage of minimum 50 x 100 cm, or the equivalent of 0.5 sq metres with at least 15–20 cm of substrate, so that they may exercise their natural urge to burrow. However, greater floor space and substrate depth is recommended for all species of hamsters, where "bigger is always better" . Additional levels do not count toward the base area. Aquariums and DIY-enclosures are commonly used amongst hamster enthusiasts, often preferred for their capability to hold greater amounts of substrate, wide availability, and cost, amongst various other reasons, over their more traditional wire-cage counterparts (See images for examples).

If fighting within a group occurs, the hamsters should be separated immediately to avoid injury.
Roborovski hamsters are very active, so a species-appropriate wheel is a necessity. Size is still debated, however the general consensus is that a wheel should be at least 16.5 cm (6.5 inches. Other sources recommend a minimum diameter of 20 cm(8 inches).

Roborovski hamsters, like many rodents, will naturally avoid large open spaces, opting to stick close to the walls if forced to cross one, where they feel safest. Providing them with multiple hiding spots is vital. This can be achieved by placing branches, tunnels and various other hides in close arrangement.

Food 

Based on their natural diet, owners should feed hamster food containing mainly grains and small seeds. Animal protein should also be offered, in form of mealworms, grasshoppers or other insects. If you do not like to feed them alive, you can purchase dried insects. Some hamsters also accept seafood such as dried gammarus.

To support their natural behaviour of foraging and stockpiling, feed should be scattered around the enclosure, hidden in several spots, or slightly buried beneath the substrate (Approximately 1tsp of food per hamster per day).

Some unsuitable foods, to be avoided, include:
 Leafy green parts of a tomato (toxic)
 Meats which are high in fat
 Chocolate or candy
 Onions, garlic and bell peppers (can cause stomach irritation)
 All citrus fruits (too acidic)
 Apple seeds
 Aubergine

Fresh water should be available at all times. A bowl is preferable to a bottle, as it encourages a more natural and comfortable drinking posture.

Hamsters' incisors never stop growing and they have a ‘self-sharpening’ system where the incisors grind against each other while gnawing, which wears the teeth down; so providing them with chew-toys is essential.

Bedding/Substrate 
Nesting materials should be easily shreddable and digestible, such as unscented toilet paper, moss, hay or leaves.

Avoid materials that separate into thin strands when chewed (such as cotton wool or similar 'fluffy' bedding products), as entanglement or ingestion poses a serious health risk to hamsters. Softwood shavings (such as pine or cedar) are also unsuitable as they contain harmful chemicals which can damage a hamster's respiratory system. Conversely, hardwood shavings such as aspen are perfectly safe to use.

To provide a means of cleaning itself and to help mimic its natural habitat, a large bowl of sand should be available at all times. sand bathing is a vital part of a hamster's daily routine and helps to keep their coat healthy and shiny by removing excess oils. The sand can be kept clean by sieving or washing out with water and drying. Children's play sand is a viable option for this, but be sure what happened to it (such as if you need to bake it).

Sand must be dust-free. Chinchilla sand is too dusty for hamsters and can cause respiratory problems. Bird sand is also not suitable, because it contains sharp elements such as shards of broken shell.

In film

The short film Roborovski, about a hamster, co-written and -directed by Tilda Cobham-Hervey and Dev Patel, premiered at Flickerfest in Sydney in January 2020, and won several awards Antipodean Film Festival at Saint Tropez, France, in 2021.

Gallery

References

Further reading
Lissenberg, J. Dwerghamsters. Aanschaf, verzorging, Voeding, Fokken Zuidboek Producties: Lisse, The Netherlands: 2002
Verhoeff-Verhallen, E. Konijnen en Knaagdieren Encyclopedie Rebo Productions: Lisse, The Netherlands: 1997

External links

Animal Diversity Web - Phodopus roborovskii

Phodopus
Mammals of Asia
Mammals described in 1903
Taxa named by Konstantin Satunin